Miles Benjamin McSweeney (April 18, 1855September 29, 1909) was the 87th governor of South Carolina from June 2, 1899, to January 20, 1903.

McSweeney was born in Charleston and was forced to become a paperboy at the age of 10 in order to help support his family when his father died. He went to Lexington, Virginia to attend Washington and Lee University upon being awarded the Typographical Union of Charleston Scholarship, but later had to withdraw due to lack of funds. He published the Ninety-Six Guardian at the age of 22 and he moved to Hampton two years later to start the Hampton County Guardian.

In 1894, McSweeney was elected to the South Carolina House of Representatives and additionally served as the chairman of the Hampton County Democratic Party. He successfully ran for Lieutenant Governor in 1896 and was elevated to the governorship following the death of Governor William Haselden Ellerbe on June 2, 1899. A proponent of the state Dispensary and backed by Senator Ben Tillman, McSweeney won a term on his own in the gubernatorial election of 1900. However, many in Hampton were in favor of prohibition and the Hampton County Guardian lost advertising revenue and subscriptions because of McSweeney's support of the Dispensary.

Upon the completion of his term as governor in 1903, McSweeney returned to Hampton and continued as editor of the Hampton County Guardian. He died in Baltimore on September 29, 1909, and was buried at Hampton Cemetery in Hampton.

External links 
 SCIway Biography of Miles Benjamin McSweeney
 NGA Biography of Miles Benjamin McSweeney
 The Political Graveyard Brief of Miles Benjamin McSweeney
 History of the Hampton County Guardian

1855 births
1909 deaths
Washington and Lee University alumni
Democratic Party governors of South Carolina
University of South Carolina trustees
American newspaper founders
19th-century American newspaper publishers (people)
American newspaper publishers (people)
Democratic Party members of the South Carolina House of Representatives
Lieutenant Governors of South Carolina